Ngatangiia is one of the five districts that make up the island of Rarotonga in the Cook Islands. It is located in the east of the island, to the south of the districts of Matavera and Avarua, and northeast of the district of Titikaveka.

References

Districts of the Cook Islands
Rarotonga